Clinical & Experimental Immunology is a peer-reviewed medical journal covering clinical and translational immunology. The editor-in-chief is Leonie Taams (King's College London). It is published by Oxford University Press on behalf of the British Society for Immunology, of which it is the official journal.

According to the Journal Citation Reports, the journal has a 2021 impact factor of 5.732, ranking it 58th out of 161 journals in the category "Immunology".

See also 
 Immunology

References

External links 
 

Immunology journals
Publications established in 1966
Wiley-Blackwell academic journals
Monthly journals
English-language journals
Academic journals associated with learned and professional societies